Feel the Fire may refer to:
Feel the Fire (Jermaine Jackson album), 1977
Feel the Fire (Claudja Barry album), 1979
Feel the Fire (Reba McEntire album), 1980
Feel the Fire (Family Brown album), 1985
Feel the Fire (Overkill album), 1985
"Feel the Fire" (song), a 1998 song by Astroline
"Feel the Fiyaaaah", a 2022 song by Metro Boomin and ASAP Rocky featuring Takeoff
"Feel the Fire", a song by Stephanie Mills from the 1979 album What Cha Gonna Do with My Lovin'